Love Blows As the Wind Blows is a song cycle for voice and piano or string quartet composed in 191112 by George Butterworth (18851916). It sets four poems by William Ernest Henley from his Book of Verses (1888). The composer orchestrated three songs from the cycle in 1914, omitting "Fill a Glass with Golden Wine".

A performance typically takes 12 minutes. The songs are as follows:

 "In the Year That's Come and Gone"
 "Life in Her Creaking Shoes"
 "Fill a Glass with Golden Wine"
 "On the Way to Kew"

Kew is a district within London next to Richmond, which is where the poet sets out from in the fourth song.

References 

Song cycles by George Butterworth
Classical song cycles in English
1912 compositions